The Hospital das Clínicas da Unicamp (Clinics Hospital of the University of Campinas, in Portuguese language) is a teaching hospital (Hospital das Clínicas) located in the city of Campinas, state of São Paulo, Brazil.

The largest public hospital in the region, it serves a population around 3.5 million people. It is a tertiary hospital, with all the medical specialties and medico-surgical services represented. It offers a total of more than 600 beds.

External links
 Hospital das Clínicas Website

Teaching hospitals in Brazil
University of Campinas
Hospitals with year of establishment missing